The Socialist Party of Ukraine (SPU) was a social democratic and democratic socialist political party in Ukraine. It was one of the oldest parties and was created by the former members of the Soviet-era Communist Party of Ukraine in late 1991 when the Communist Party was banned. It was represented in the Verkhovna Rada (Ukraine's parliament) from 1994 to 2007 and was the third or fourth largest party in the Rada over the 13 years. From 2007 onwards the election results of the party became extremely marginal. Oleksandr Moroz led the party for more than twenty years. The party was suspended in the wake of the February 2022 Russian invasion of Ukraine and it was officially banned by a court decision on 15 June 2022. The slogan of the party was "Socialism will be imbued with patriotism".

History

Creation 

After Ukraine gained independence on 24 August 1991, Leonid Kravchuk as the Chairman of the Verkhovna Rada (Ukraine's parliament) signed several important documents among which was the disbandment (26 August) and later the prohibition (30 August) of communist parties. This led to the collapse of the communist majority faction, informally known as the "group of 239". Four days after the prohibition of communist parties, Oleksandr Moroz, the former leader of Group 239, called on communists to unite in a new left-wing party. In September in several major cities (particularly in Donetsk, Dnipropetrovsk and Kharkiv) local subsidiaries of the new party were founded. The founding congress of the party was held in Kyiv on 26 October 1991 and the first leader of the party became Moroz. The Socialist Party was registered at the Ukrainian Ministry of Justice on 25 November 1991 under registration number 157.

On 19 June 1993, a constituent congress of the recreated Communist Party of Ukraine took place in Donetsk that proclaimed itself a direct inheritor of the Communist Party of Ukraine. After the recreation of the Communists a substantial number of the former Communist Party of Ukraine members left the Socialist Party. The Communist Party, however, finally registered in October 1993. In December 1993 the Socialists proclaimed to be in the opposition to the government of Leonid Kuchma and the President Leonid Kravchuk. In the 1994 presidential election, the Socialists leader Moroz was supported by both his party and the Communist Party. The Socialist party became known for its support in the central regions of Ukraine in the 1990s and 2000s.

1994 parliamentary election 

In the rounds of the 1994 parliamentary election, the party won 14 seats. In May 1994, Moroz became Chairman of the Verkhovna Rada (speaker of parliament). By mid-1994, the party controlled a parliamentary faction of 25 deputies. In October 1995, some members headed by Nataliya Vitrenko split to form (in April 1996) the new, much more radical Progressive Socialist Party of Ukraine.

1998 parliamentary election 

The party stood for election in 1998 in the Socialist Party – Peasant Party electoral bloc with the Peasant Party of Ukraine. Attempts to form a coalition with the Communist Party had failed. The block was named Left Center won 8,55% of the votes and 29 proportional seats and 5 individual seats out of 450 seats in the Verkhovna Rada. The bloc gained the post Chairman of the Verkhovna Rada (speaker of parliament) with the election of Oleksandr Tkachenko on this post. The Peasant Party of Ukraine started its own parliamentary faction (containing 15 deputies) in the autumn of 1998 but in the spring of 2000 this factions was disbanded for lack of member. After the creation of the new parliamentary faction Solidarity in the spring of 2000 a lot of deputies of Peasant Party moved to this new faction. In June 2002, the Left Center faction had 17 members.

After the election, a group of former SPU members led by Ivan Chizh who were in opposition to Moroz founded the Justice Party in 2000.

2002 parliamentary election 

The party was heavily involved in the Ukraine without Kuchma campaign.

At the parliamentary election on 30 March 2002, the party won 6.9% of the popular vote, and 24 out of 450 seats in the Verkhovna Rada. The party had limited access to media in the campaign. The youth wing of the party had left it and had endorsed Social Democratic Party of Ukraine (united) in the election.

In late 2002, Moroz, Viktor Yushchenko (Our Ukraine), Petro Symonenko (Communist Party of Ukraine) and Yulia Tymoshenko (Yulia Tymoshenko Bloc) issued a joint statement concerning "the beginning of a state revolution in Ukraine". The communists stepped out of the alliance, Symonenko was against a single candidate from the alliance in the Ukrainian presidential election 2004, but the other three party's remained allies (until July 2006). The Socialists were active participants in the Orange Revolution. The party was a coalition member in the First Tymoshenko Government and the Yekhanurov Government.

In 2005, the party was joined by the Ukrainian Party of Justice – Union of veterans, handicapped, Chornobyl liquidators, and Afghan warriors (former Ukrainian Party of Justice).

2006 parliamentary election 

 
The Socialist Party received 5.67% of the national vote during the parliamentary election held on 26 March 2006, securing 33 seats in Parliament. 
 
The Socialist Party of Ukraine was expected to form a governing coalition with Yulia Tymoshenko and Our Ukraine. However, after 3 months of negotiation agreement could not be finalized with Our Ukraine challenging Moroz's appointment as Chairman of the Verkhovna Rada (chairman of parliament). The Socialist Party then agreed to the formation of an "Anti Crisis" coalition with Party of Regions and the Communist Party following the election of Oleksandr Moroz as Chairman of the Verkhovna Rada in July 2006. The newly formed governing coalition elected Viktor Yanukovych as Prime minister of Ukraine and was later renamed the Alliance of National Unity. Several high up members left the party because of it becoming a partner in the new coalition, influential former member Yuriy Lutsenko created People's Self-Defense. President of Ukraine Yushchenko dissolved parliament on 2 April 2007 because he believed the government was acting illegally  during the 2007 Ukrainian political crisis.

2007 parliamentary election 

In the 2007 parliamentary election, the party's vote share collapsed. The Socialist Party of Ukraine failed to secure parliamentary representation, having received 2.86% of the total national vote (0.14% short of the required minimum 3% representation threshold). This led to more high-ranking members leaving the party and the creation of the offspring Union of Leftists.

After having led the party for 20 years, Oleksander Moroz in July 2010 was succeeded by Vasyl Tsushko. However, Moroz was again elected as party leader in August 2011.

2012 parliamentary election 

A March 2010 poll predicted that the party would get 0.2% of the vote at the 2012 Ukrainian parliamentary election. In the 2010 local elections, the parties electoral misfortunes continued, winning few votes and securing little to no representatives in regional parliaments across Ukraine (winning representatives in 11 Ukrainian Oblasts parliaments in total), except in the Chernihiv Oblast and Poltava Oblast where they won 11% and 5,8% of the votes.

In July 2011, the party was expelled from the Socialist International alongside Party of Bulgarian Social Democrats due to the parties' non-compliance with "the fundamental values ​​and principles of the International" in the midst of the Arab Spring.

In November 2011, plans to merge 11 parties, including the Socialist Party of Ukraine, fell through when the party's council refused to ratify the agreement. Instead, in December 2011 Moroz announced that the Peasant Party of Ukraine, Socialist Ukraine, Children of War, Children of War — People's Party of Ukraine, and Cossack Glory had merged into the Socialist Party. The remaining five parties that had been part of the original agreement opted to form United Left and Peasants. However, in January 2012 the Ministry of Justice declared the merger of Peasant Party and the Socialist Party to be illegal.

In April 2012, Petro Ustenko was elected leader of the party, replacing Oleksander Moroz. In the election the party won 0.46% of the national votes and no constituencies (it had competed in 58 constituencies) and thus failed to win parliamentary representation.

Final years 

The party did not participate in the 2014 Ukrainian parliamentary election.

In 2017 Serhiy Kaplin, at the time a member of the Ukrainian parliamentary faction of Petro Poroshenko Bloc, claimed to be the party's chairman. Kaplin intended to take the party to elections with Party of Pensioners of Ukraine under the label "For ordinary people". But Illia Kyva also claimed to headed the Socialist Party of Ukraine. In January 2018, during a "joint meeting of the political council and the central control commission of the Socialist Party of Ukraine" Kyva was  expelled from the party. Kyva stated this exclusion was  illegitimate. According to the official registration of the party Illia Kyva is the chairman of the Socialist Party. Kyva left the party in June 2019 to join Opposition Platform — For life.

In the 2019 Ukrainian parliamentary election the party had two candidates in constituencies, but neither won a parliamentary seat.

The SPU was one of several political parties suspended by the National Security and Defense Council of Ukraine during the 2022 Russian invasion of Ukraine, along with Derzhava, Left Opposition, Nashi, Opposition Bloc, Opposition Platform — For Life, Party of Shariy, Progressive Socialist Party of Ukraine, Union of Leftists, and the Volodymyr Saldo Block.

On 15 June 2022 the Eighth Administrative Court of Appeal banned the SPU (of all the  parties suspended on 20 March 2022 only the Progressive Socialist Party of Ukraine and Opposition Platform — For Life actively opposed its banning). The property of the party and all its branches were transferred to the state. According to the Security Service of Ukraine, Illia Kyva continued to influence the party and its course. At the time of the banning of the party its official leader was Viktor Zaika, who was also the director of the Illia Kiva Liberation Charitable Foundation. On 18 April 2022, it was reported that Ukraine's State Bureau of Investigations had opened a case of treason against Kyva for involvement in an illegal arrangement with a general of the Russian Armed Forces.

On 18 October 2022 the final appeal against the party's ban was dismissed by the Supreme Court of Ukraine, meaning that the party was fully banned in Ukraine.

Presidential election results 
The party's candidate for the 1999 presidential election, Oleksander Moroz, came third, with 11.3% of the vote in the first round. Oleksander Moroz also participated in the 2004 presidential election's first-round ballot where he again came in third place, receiving 5.82% of the vote, and subsequently endorsed Viktor Yushchenko in the final run-off ballots.

The Socialist Party chose Oleksandr Moroz as their presidential candidate for the next presidential election, scheduled to be held on 17 January 2010. 268 out of 422 party congress delegates registered supported the Moroz's nomination.

Parliamentary election results

See also 
 Communist Party of Ukraine (Soviet Union)
 List of political parties in Ukraine
 Politics of Ukraine

Notes

References

External links

 

 
1991 establishments in Ukraine
2022 disestablishments in Ukraine
Banned political parties in Ukraine
Banned socialist parties
Defunct social democratic parties in Ukraine
Former member parties of the Socialist International
Parliamentary factions in Ukraine
Political parties disestablished in 2022
Political parties established in 1991
Political parties in the Soviet Union